Uahuka is a genus of South Pacific sheet weavers endemic to the Marquesas Islands that was first described by Lucien Berland in 1935. It was transferred to the family Symphytognathidae in 1972, but the transfer was rejected in 1980.

The genus is named after Ua Huka on the Marquesas Islands. It is one of several genera that Lucien Berland named after islands in the Pacific Ocean during the 1930s. Other names derived from islands in the Marquesas are Uapou and Nukuhiva. The specific name of U. affinis is derived from the Latin affinis, meaning "allied, related". Spinifrons translates to "spiny front".

Species
 it contains two species:
Uahuka affinis Berland, 1935 − Marquesas Is.
Uahuka spinifrons Berland, 1935 − Marquesas Is.

See also
 List of Linyphiidae species (Q–Z)

References

Further reading
 Berland, L. (1935). Nouvelles araignées marquisiennes. Bernice P. Bishop Mus. Bull. 142: 31-63.

External links
 Diagnostic drawings of both species

Araneomorphae genera
Linyphiidae
Spiders of Oceania
Taxa named by Lucien Berland